The term "Fuke" is Japanese and may refer to:

 Fuke, known as Puhua, in Chinese, the legendary precursor to the eponymous Fuke Zen school of Buddhism in Japan
 Fuke Zen, a distinct and ephemeral sect of Zen Buddhism that once flourished in Japan

People with the surname
, Japanese footballer

Japanese-language surnames